A cantonment is a military or police quarters.

Cantonment may also refer to:

Bangladesh
Cantonment Public School and College, Rangpur

Ghana
Cantonments, Accra, a residential suburb

India
Kollam Cantonment, a residential neighbourhood

Malaysia
Cantonment Road, a road in George Town, Penang

Pakistan
Cantonment (Pakistan), several permanent military bases
Cantonment Public School, Karachi

Singapore
Cantonment Road, Singapore, a road in Singapore
Cantonment MRT station

United States
Cantonment, Florida, a town
Cantonment, on the National Register of Historic Places listings in Blaine County, Oklahoma

See also